The 2009–10 Idaho Vandals men's basketball team represented the University of Idaho during the 2009–10 NCAA Division I men's basketball season.  Members of the Western Athletic Conference (WAC), the Vandals were led by second-year head coach Don Verlin and played their home games on campus at Cowan Spectrum in Moscow, Idaho.

They met second-seed and host Nevada in the quarterfinals of the conference tournament in Reno and lost by sixteen points.

Pre-season
In the WAC preseason polls, released October 20 via media teleconference, Idaho was selected to finish fourth in both the media and coaches poll and senior guard Mac Hobson was selected to the All-WAC first team by both the media and coaches.

Roster

Coaching staff

Schedule and results

|-
!colspan=5 style=| Exhibition

|-
!colspan=5 style=| Regular Season

|-
!colspan=5 style=| WAC Tournament

References

Idaho
Idaho Vandals men's basketball seasons
Idaho
Idaho